Aleksandar Radulović (born January 30, 1984) is a Montenegrin professional basketball center who plays for Kožuv of the Macedonian League.

External links

References 

1984 births
Living people
Montenegrin men's basketball players
KK Teodo Tivat players
Sportspeople from Nikšić
Centers (basketball)
Soproni KC players